The Zeuzerinae are a subfamily of the family Cossidae (carpenter or goat moths).

Genera
 Allocryptobia Viette, 1951
 Alophonotus Schoorl, 1990
 Aramos Schoorl, 1990
 Bergaris Schoorl, 1990
 Brypoctia Schoorl, 1960
 Butaya Yakovlev, 2004
 Carohamilia Dyar, 1937
 Cecryphalus Schoorl, 1990
Davidlivingstonia 
 Eburgemellus Schoorl, 1990
 Eulophonotus Felder, 1874
 Hamilcara Barnes & McDunnough, 1910 (tentatively placed here)
 Hermophyllon Schoorl, 1990
 Lakshmia Yakovlev, 2004
 Morpheis Hübner, 1820 (tentatively placed here)
 Neurozerra Yakovlev, 2011
 Orientozeuzera Yakovlev, 2011
 Oreocossus Aurivillius, 1910
 Paralophonotus Schoorl, 1990
 Phragmacossia Schawerda, 1924 (tentatively placed here)
 Phragmataecia Newman, 1850
 Polyphagozerra Yakovlev, 2011
 Pseudozeuzera Schoorl, 1990
 Psychonoctua Grote, 1865 (tentatively placed here)
 Rapdalus Schoorl, 1990
 Relluna Schoorl, 1990
 Roerichiora Yakovlev & Witt, 2009
 Rugigegat Schoorl, 1990
 Schoorlea Yakovlev, 2011
 Schreiteriana D. S. Fletcher, 1982
 Tarsozeuzera Schoorl, 1990
 Voousia Schoorl, 1990
 Yakovlevina Kemal & Koçak, 2005
 Zeuroepkia Yakovlev, 2011
 Zeurrora Yakovlev, 2011
 Zeuzera Latreille, 1804
 Zeuzeropecten Gaede, 1930

Xyleutini
A tribe erected by Houlbert in 1916
 Acosma Yakovlev, 2011
 Aethalopteryx Schoorl, 1990
 Azygophleps Hampson, [1893]
 Brephomorpha D. S. Fletcher, 1982
 Brevicyttara D. S. Fletcher & Nye, 1982
 Catoxophylla Turner, 1945
 Chalcidica Hübner, 1816
 Duomitus Butler, 1880
 Endoxyla Herrich-Schäffer, 1854 (previously Luzoniella Yakovlev, 2006)
 Panau Schoorl, 1990
 Sansara Yakovlev, 2004
 Sinjaeviella Yakovlev, 2009
 Skeletophyllon Schoorl, 1990
 Strigocossus Houlbert, 1916
 Sympycnodes Turner, 1932
 Trismelasmos Schoorl, 1990
 Xyleutes Hübner, 1820

References

 , 2005: Nomenclatural notes on various taxa of the moths (Lepidoptera). Centre for Entomological Studies Ankara, Miscellaneous Papers 91/92: 11–14.
 , 1990: A phylogenetic study on Cossidae (Lepidoptera: Ditrysia) based on external adult morphology. Zoologische Verhandelingen 263: 1–295. Full article: .
 , 2004: Cossidae of Thailand. Part 1. (Lepidoptera: Cossidae). Atalanta 35 (3-4): 335–351.
 , 2004: New taxa of Cossidae from SE Asia. Atalanta 35(3-4): 369–382.
 , 2004: Cossidae of Thailand. Part 2. (Lepidoptera: Cossidae). Atalanta 35 (3-4): 383–389.
 , 2006, New Cossidae (Lepidoptera) from Asia, Africa and Macronesia, Tinea 19 (3): 188–213.
 , 2009: New taxa of African and Asian Cossidae (Lepidoptera). Euroasian Entomological Journal 8 (3): 353–361. Full article: .
 , 2013: The Cossidae (Lepidoptera) of Malawi with descriptions of two new species. Zootaxa, 3709 (4): 371–393. Abstract: 
 , 2010: Aethalopteryx diksami, a new species (Lepidoptera: Cossidae) from Yemen, Sokotra Island. Esperiana Memoir 5: 333–335.
 , 2009: The Carpenter Moths (Lepidoptera:Cossidae) of Vietnam. Entomofauna Supplement 16: 11–32.

External links
Natural History Museum Lepidoptera generic names catalogue

 
Moth subfamilies